In molecular biology, HOXB13 antisense RNA 1 (non-protein coding), also known as HOXB13-AS1, is a long non-coding RNA. It was formerly known as PRAC2 (prostate, rectum and colon 2). It was identified in a human prostate cDNA library, and (in humans) is found in prostate, rectum, distal colon, and testis. In humans it is found on chromosome 17q21.

See also
 Long noncoding RNA

References

Non-coding RNA